Angel Witch is the first album by British heavy metal band Angel Witch. The album was released in 1980 through Bronze Records, and since then re-released in four editions over the years. The cover features a painting formerly attributed to John Martin titled The Fallen Angels Entering Pandemonium. The album made Angel Witch one of the key bands in the new wave of British heavy metal movement.

Reception and legacy

Angel Witch received generally very positive reviews. The only exception was the very first review of the album by journalist Paul Suter for the influential British music paper Sounds in 1980. Suter defined the album "appalling" and "weedy", marred by a "destructively dreadful" production and by weak vocals. Another Sound reviewer Malcolm Dome, on the contrary, loved the album for its aggressiveness mixed with melody and declared it the "album of the year" together with Girlschool's Demolition. Canadian reviewer Martin Popoff says that this is "the only Angel Witch album of deep importance", being "the first panoramic black metal statement of the modern era"; its "mix of gothic melody, sinister surprise and scorching dense riffery" establishes "the band as genuinely scary" and "isolated and elevated from the fun-loving metal community" of the time. Mike Stagno of the Sputnikmusic editorial staff reminds how Angel Witch "is regarded by many as a NWOBHM classic alongside the likes of Iron Maiden,  On Through the Night, and Wheels of Steel" and, despite some flaws in the general sound, it is "a gem"; he adds that the band Angel Witch "never really achieved what they deserved ". The AllMusic review underlines this last concept and defines the album a "metal classic". Chad Bowar of About.com recommends the album, which deserve much recognition for being one of the NWOBHM albums responsible for "shaping the rise of thrash metal in the mid '80s" and "a major part of one of the most important eras of metal".

The opening track "Angel Witch" was featured in the 2009 video game, Brütal Legend.

Track listings

In 1990, the album was re-issued by Roadrunner Records and contained three bonus tracks. The three tracks were originally featured on the 1981 EP Loser.

In 2000, the album was re-issued by Castle Records and contained six bonus tracks, in addition to the 3 previous bonus tracks, the album also included the following three tracks. Tracks 14 and 16 that were originally B-sides for the Sweet Danger EP. Track 15 is from the NWOBHM compilation album Metal for Muthas.

On 2 August 2005, the album was re-issued by Castle Records again labeled the 25th Anniversary Expanded Edition, with slightly different album cover. It also featured a remastered sound and an expanded booklet, as well as even more bonus tracks. In addition to the above six bonus tracks, it also included the following 4 tracks, recorded for 14 March 1980 edition of the BBC's Friday Rock Show.

30th Anniversary edition
In 2010 the album was re-issued by Sanctuary Records in a 2-Disc version, adding demos and other versions of some songs with a total of 30 songs.

In 2016, it was reissued in colored vinyl, with the same track listing as the first release.

Personnel
Band members
Kevin Heybourne – guitars, lead vocals
Kevin Riddles – bass, keyboards, backing vocals
Dave Hogg – drums

Production
Martin Smith – producer
Mark Dearnley, Ashley Howe, John Gallen – engineers
Jools Cooper, Nick Rogers – assistant engineers

References

1980 debut albums
Angel Witch albums
Bronze Records albums